Major General David James Eastman,  is a senior British Army officer. Between February 2020 and July 2022, he served as General Officer Commanding, Regional Command.

Military career
Eastman was commissioned into the Royal Electrical and Mechanical Engineers in 1989. He became commanding officer of 2 Close Support Battalion REME. After that he became commander of 102nd Logistic Brigade in September 2015, and Head of Military International Policy and Planning at the Ministry of Defence in May 2017. He was appointed General Officer Commanding Regional Command in February 2020. Eastman was also titled as 'Commander Standing Joint Command (UK)' in a more recent MOD news release. A Freedom of Information release stated that Eastman temporarily held the appointment of Commander Standing Joint Command (UK) from 25 May to 7 September 2020. Eastman was promoted the substantive rank of major general on 14 February 2020.

In September 2022 he was appointed Assistant Chief of the Defence Staff (Capability and Force Design).

Eastman was appointed a Member of the Order of the British Empire, for services during the first UK deployment to Helmand Province, in December 2006.

References

Living people
Royal Electrical and Mechanical Engineers officers
Members of the Order of the British Empire
Year of birth missing (living people)